Trần Văn Giáp (Hanoi, ,1902 - 25 November 1973) was a Vietnamese historian who wrote the first widely published histories of Buddhism in Vietnam in French. The two volumes, for Annam and Tonkin respectively were published in Paris in 1932. Giáp was an authority on Hán-Nôm (i.e. both Chinese and Demotic script) literature. On his return to Vietnam he published various other histories in Vietnamese, both in Latin alphabet quốc ngữ and Chinese chữ Nho.

Works
Le Bouddhisme en Annam des origines au XIIIè siècle 1932
Esquisse d'une histoire du Bouddhisme au Tonkin 1932
Les chapitres bibliographiques de Lê Quý Đôn et de Phan Huy Chú 1938
Vần Quốc ngữ 1938
Lược khảo về khoa cử Việt Nam 1941
Relation d'une ambassade annamite en Chine au XVIII siècle 1941
Hán văn trích thái diễn giảng khóa bản 1942 (written in chữ Nho)
Hà Nội Viễn Đông khảo cổ học viện hiện tàng Việt Nam Phật điển lược biên 1943 (written in chữ Nho)
Lịch sử Trung Quốc 1956
Lịch sử cận đại Trung Quốc 1956
Nguyễn Trãi quốc âm thi tập 1957
Việt sử thông giám cương mục 1957 (translated with Hoa Bằng and Phạm Trọng Điềm)
Bích Câu Kỳ ngộ khảo thích 1958
Lưu Vĩnh Phúc, tướng Cờ Đen 1958
Vân đài loại ngữ 1962
Lược truyện các tác gia Việt Nam 1962
Từ điển tiếng Việt 1967
Nguyễn Trãi toàn tập 1969
Phong thổ Hà Bắc 1971
Tìm hiểu kho sách Hán Nôm
Ngọc Kiều Lê 1976
Lược khảo vấn đề chữ Nôm 2002 (posthumous, edited by Lê Văn Đặng)

References

1902 births
1973 deaths
20th-century Vietnamese historians
People from Hanoi